By the Grace of God (abbreviated D.G.) is a formulaic phrase used especially in Christian monarchies as an introductory part of the full styles of a monarch. For example in England and later the United Kingdom, the phrase was formally added to the royal style in 1521 and continues to be used to this day. For example, on UK coinage, the abbreviation DG still appears.

History and rationale

Originally, it had a literal meaning: the  divine right of kings was invoked—notably by Christian monarchs—as legitimation (the only one above every sublunary power) for the absolutist authority the monarch wielded, that is, the endorsement of God for the monarch's reign.

By custom, the phrase "by the Grace of God" is restricted to sovereign rulers; in the feudal logic, a vassal held fief not by the grace of God, but by grant of a superior noble. Yet this did not stop kings using it, even when they did homage to the pope (as viceregent of God) or another ruler, such as the Kingdom of Bavaria, a state of the Holy Roman Empire.

Parallels exist in other civilizations, e.g. Mandate of Heaven of the Chinese empire, where for centuries the official decrees by the emperors of China invariably began with the phrase 「奉天承運皇帝，詔曰」 which is translated as "The Emperor, by the Grace of Heaven, decrees".

Contemporary usage
The traditional phrase "by the grace of God" is still included in the full titles and styles of the monarchs of Denmark, Liechtenstein, the Netherlands, Monaco and the United Kingdom.

In other Commonwealth realms, who share the same monarch with the United Kingdom, the style is used in Antigua and Barbuda, Australia, The Bahamas, Belize, Canada, Grenada, Jamaica, New Zealand, Solomon Islands, St. Kitts and Nevis, St Lucia, St. Vincent and the Grenadines, and Tuvalu. Papua New Guinea does not use the style.

The phrase was used in Luxembourg until 2000, when Henri, the current grand duke, decided to drop it. During the 20th century dictatorship of Francisco Franco in Spain, Spanish coins bore a legend identifying him as Francisco Franco Caudillo de España por la G de Dios  ("Francisco Franco Caudillo of Spain by the G(race) of God").

The phrase is not used in the monarchies of Belgium, Luxembourg (Jean, abdicated 2000), Norway (Haakon VII, died 1957) and Sweden (Gustav VI Adolf, died 1973). In Spain, article 56(2) of the 1978 constitution, states that the title of the King of Spain is simply "King of Spain" (Rey de España) but that he "can use the titles that correspond to the Crown". As a result, the King of Spain may use "by the grace of God", but this is not used on official documents.

Variant examples
In some cases, the formula was combined with a reference to another legitimation, especially such democratic notions as the social contract, e.g.
 Prince Louis-Napoléon Bonaparte was crowned Napoléon III, Emperor of the French, By the Grace of God and the Will of the Nation (Par la Grâce de Dieu, et la Volonté Nationale) after a plebiscite organised among the French people.
 Oliver Cromwell was Lord Protector by the Grace of God, and the Republic, denoting that he was chosen by God to rule but he was put there by the people of the 'Commonwealth' (British republic).
 Agustín de Iturbide of Mexico was styled Agustín I, By the Providence of God, Constitutional Emperor of Mexico. Mexico's second emperor, Maximilian, used the style "By the Grace of God and Will of the People, Emperor of Mexico."
 By the Grace of God and the Will of the Nation (Per Grazia di Dio e Volontà della Nazione) in the Kingdom of Italy, as well as in the Italian Empire, where the king was styled By the Grace of God and the Will of the [Italian] Nation King of Italy, King of Albania, Emperor of Ethiopia which though omitted the titularity as King of Cyprus and Jerusalem which had instead styled the House of Savoy previously and along with Duke of Savoia, King of Sardinia, Prince of Piedmont
 By the Grace of God and the Will of People in the Kingdom of Serbia and the Kingdom of Yugoslavia. The same title was used in the Polish–Lithuanian Commonwealth when, starting with King Henryk Walezy and ending with King Stanisław August Poniatowski, the king was chosen by the noblemen in a free election.
 Sovereigns of the Kingdom of Hawai'i were styled "By the Grace of God and under the Constitution of the Hawaiian Islands, King (or Queen)"
 Brazilian emperors used the style "By the Grace of God and Unanimous Acclamation of the Peoples, Constitutional Emperor and Perpetual Defender of Brazil" ("Pela Graça de Deus e Unânime Aclamação dos Povos, Imperador Constitucional e Defensor Perpétuo do Brasil") in the constitutional Empire of Brazil.

See also
 Billah
 Dei Gratia Regina, discussing the use of the phrase on coins
 Mandate of Heaven

Feudalism
Heads of state
Monarchy
Royal styles
Religion and politics